"Teenage Crime" is a song performed by Swedish dance music producer and DJ Adrian Lux, released on 11 June 2010.

Music video
The music video was directed by Tobias Hansson in Stockholm, Sweden. It depicts a story about a middle-aged mother who cannot hide from her past by leaving her family in the night as a modern-day cougar catching young hipster boys at a partying nightclub to spend and make out with.

Cultural impact
The "Axwell & Henrik B Remode" of the song was included on Swedish House Mafia's debut album Until One in 2010.

Greenpeace have used the song in an advertisement  targeting Coca-Cola for its stance against Container deposit legislation in Australia. This ad was banned by the Nine Network and has since become popular on YouTube.

Track listing
Digital Download" 
 "Teenage Crime" (Radio Edit) - 2:48	
 "Teenage Crime" (Original) - 6:07	
 "Teenage Crime" (Axwell & Henrik B Remode) - 7:03 
 "Teenage Crime" (Axwell Remix) - 6:56	
 "Teenage Crime" (Instrumental) - 6:06

Charts

Certifications

References

2010 singles
2010 songs
Techno songs